Nifoxipam (3-hydroxydesmethylflunitrazepam, DP 370) is a benzodiazepine that is a minor metabolite of flunitrazepam and has been sold online as a designer drug.

Nifoxipam produces strong tranquillising and sleep-prolonging effects and has much lower toxicity compared to lormetazepam and flunitrazepam in mice.

See also 
 List of benzodiazepine designer drugs
 Nitrazolam
 Nitemazepam
 Phenazepam

References 

Designer drugs
Fluoroarenes
GABAA receptor positive allosteric modulators
Glycine receptor antagonists
Lactams
Nitrobenzodiazepines
Lactims